Dave Alvin and the Guilty Women is an album by American artist Dave Alvin, released in 2009. It reached number 35 on the Top Independent Albums chart.

Reception

Writing for Allmusic, music critic Mark Deming called the album "an album that often comes out of pain, but it also speaks of joy, perseverance, and the acceptance of the mysteries of life, and Dave's collaborators make this little miracle come to life as much as he does. It's something they can all point to with pride." Ben Childs of PopMatters wrote "The sound here isn’t a radical departure from Alvin’s recent work; he still works within broad templates of Americanisms: folk ballads, rock ‘n’ roll, jump blues. Frequently, the music alternates between up-tempo shuffles and somber ballads, with songs nicely rounded by the backing vocals of his band-mates and filled with sweetened fiddle lines and liquid guitar figures propped up by delicate brush and snare percussion."

Track listing
All songs by Dave Alvin unless otherwise noted.
"Marie Marie" – 3:29
"California's Burning" – 5:06
"Downey Girl" – 5:08
"Weight of the World" (Christy McWilson) – 3:27
"Anyway" (Dave Alvin, Amy Farris) – 3:49
"Boss of the Blues" – 4:20
"Potter's Field" (Christy McWilson) – 3:42
"River Under the Road" (Jimmie Dale Gilmore) – 3:38
"These Times We're Living In" – 4:42
"Nana and Jimi" – 3:22
"Don't Make Promises" (Tim Hardin) – 6:39
"Que Sera, Sera (Whatever Will Be, Will Be)" (Jay Livingston, Ray Evans) – 4:43

Personnel
Dave Alvin – vocals, guitar, National Steel guitar
Marcia Ball – piano
Cindy Cashdollar – guitar, lap steel guitar, National Steel guitar, Weissenborn
Amy Farris – viola, violin, vocal harmony
Nina Gerber – guitar
Laurie Lewis – mandolin, violin, vocal harmony
Christy McWilson – vocal harmony, vocals on "Potter's Field"
Lisa Pankratz – drums, percussion
Suzy Thompson – accordion

Production notes
Sam Seifert – engineer
Mark Linett – engineer, mixing, mastering
Michael Triplett – design
Nancy Sefton – art direction
Todd V. Wolfson – photography
Amy Ferris – orchestration

References

2009 albums
Dave Alvin albums
Yep Roc Records albums